Blues to Africa is a solo piano album by American jazz pianist Randy Weston, recorded in 1974 and released on the Freedom label in 1975.

Reception

AllMusic awarded the album 4 stars, with its review by Scott Yanow stating: "This is a particularly strong solo performance by the unique pianist Randy Weston. He interprets eight of his originals, all of which are to an extent influenced by African music".

Track listing 
All compositions by Randy Weston.
 "African Village/Bedford-Stuyvesant" - 5:15    
 "Tangier Bay" - 7:03    
 "Blues to Africa" - 5:05    
 "Kasbah Kids" - 3:14    
 "Uhuru Kwanza" - 5:02    
 "The Call" - 3:27    
 "Kucheza Blues" - 6:07    
 "Sahel" - 5:18

Personnel 
Randy Weston - piano

References 

Randy Weston albums
1975 albums
Freedom Records albums
Solo piano jazz albums